is a song by Japanese singer Akane Sugazaki. It was released on 28 May 2003 through Giza Studio, as the third single from her debut studio album Beginning (2003). The song reached number thirty-eight in Japan and has sold over 7,389 copies nationwide. The song served as the theme song to the Japanese anime television series, Detective School Q.

Track listing

Charts

Weekly charts

Personnel
 Akane Sugazaki vocals 
 Aika Ohno backing vocals 
 Keiko Masuda backing vocals 
 Yoshinobu Ohga acoustic guitar, electric guitar , production, programming 
 Satoru Kobayashi production, programming 
 Katsuo Urano recording engineering 
 Akio Nakajima mixing 
 Masahiro Shimada mastering

Certification and sales

|-
! scope="row"| Japan (RIAJ)
| 
| 7,389
|-
|}

Release history

References

2003 singles
2003 songs
J-pop songs
Song recordings produced by Daiko Nagato